Chrysorychia is a genus of butterflies in the family Lycaenidae. In some systems it is  a synonym of Axiocerses

Lycaenidae
Lycaenidae genera